A barrier reef is a type of coral reef formed offshore. It may also refer to:

Specific barrier reefs, including the
Belize Barrier Reef, straddling the coast of Belize, within the Mesoamerican Barrier Reef System
Great Barrier Reef, in Australia, the world's largest coral reef system
Mesoamerican Barrier Reef System, which covers over 1000 km from Isla Contoy at Yucatán Peninsula to Belize, Guatemala, and the Bay Islands of Honduras
New Caledonian barrier reef, in the South Pacific

Television series
Barrier Reef (TV series), an Australian television series